Brian Wayne Alford (born June 7, 1975) is a former American football wide receiver. During his National Football League career, he played for the New York Giants.

Early life
A 1993 graduate of Oak Park High School in Oak Park, Michigan, Alford was a standout member of the football and track and field teams. He was a three-year starter for football, and named to the Oakland Press Dream Team, first-team all-state as well as voted to play in the Michigan All-Star game as a senior.

College career
Alford attended Purdue University on a football scholarship. In 1993, Alford redshirted. In 1994, he played in the final five games after recovering from a broken clavicle, sustained in preseason Black & Gold Game.
As a sophomore, he started first 6 games and played in all 11 games, leading the team in catches and TDs.
As a junior in 1996, he was named First-team All-Big Ten and Purdue's MVP. He placed 22nd in NCAA in pass receptions, and 2nd in the conference and 17th in nation in yardage. On November 23, 1996, Alford had the 2nd greatest about of receiving yards in a single Old Oaken Bucket game, with  162 yards. He also established a career-high 12 touchdown receptions.
With Joe Tiller taking over as Purdue's head coach in 1997, he set career highs in catches (67) and yards (1,228). He was named a team captain, First-team All-American by Sporting News News, 2nd team by the AP 3rd team by Sporting News. He graduated as the all-time leader in receiving yards and receiving touchdowns. He also set single season receiving yards, and at the time of his graduation, ranked 4th on all-time Big Ten single season list 4th in TD, 4th in receiving yards, and 8th in receptions.
He also holds the Purdue record for receiving touchdowns in a career, 31, as well as placing in the top 5 in several other Purdue receiving records.

Statistics
Source:

Numbers in Bold are Purdue school records

Professional career

New York Giants
Alford was drafted in the 3rd round, 70th overall, by the New York Giants, in the 1998 NFL Draft. He was released August 27, 2000 after appearing in just 6 games over the course of 2 seasons, making just 2 catches.

Miami Dolphins
Alford would sign with the Miami Dolphins later in 2000, and was placed on the practice squad. He was released on December 7, 2000, only to be re-signed on December 13, and then was then released again on July 12, 2001.

Indiana Firebirds
For the 2003 season, Alford started as a practice squad member of the Indiana Firebirds of the Arena Football League. He was later signed off the practice squad, catching 6 passes for 148 yards and 3 touchdowns.

References

1975 births
Living people
People from Oak Park, Michigan
American football wide receivers
Purdue Boilermakers football players
New York Giants players
Indiana Firebirds players